Gallimore is an English surname. Notable people with the surname include: 

Alec D. Gallimore, American aerospace engineer
Angie Gallimore, English footballer
Byron Gallimore, American record producer
Dan Gallimore (born 2003), English footballer
Eddie Gallimore (born 1964), American politician
George Gallimore (1886–1949), British footballer
Jamie Gallimore (born 1957), Canadian ice hockey player
Lesle Gallimore (born 1963), American soccer coach
María Gallimore (born 1989), Panamanian model
Neville Gallimore (born 1997), American football player
Neville Eden Gallimore, Jamaican politician
Stanley Gallimore (1910–1994), British footballer
Tony Gallimore (born 1972), British footballer

See also
Gallimore, Virginia